Atherix pachypus is a species of watersnipe fly in the family Athericidae.

Distribution
United States.

References

Athericidae
Insects described in 1887
Diptera of North America
Taxa named by Jacques-Marie-Frangile Bigot